Community school may refer to:
 Community school (England and Wales), a type of state-funded school in which the local education authority employs the school's staff, is responsible for the school's admissions and owns the school's estate
 Community school (Ireland), a type of secondary school funded directly by the state
 Community school (United States), a type of publicly funded school that serves as both an educational institution and a center of community life
Full-service community schools in the United States

Individual schools 
 Community Magnet Charter School, Los Angeles, California
 Community School (Sun Valley, Idaho)
 The Community School, Camden, Maine
 Community School (Teaneck, New Jersey)
 Community High School (Ann Arbor, Michigan)
 Community High School (Texas)
 Community High School (Teaneck, New Jersey)
 Community High School (West Chicago)
 The Community School (Decatur, Georgia)

See also
 American Community School (disambiguation)
 Community High School (disambiguation)
 Community Christian School (disambiguation)